Shaik Abdul Hameed is an Indian ten-pin bowling player. In 2014, he won Thailand Tour Title of Asian Bowling Federation (ABF) in Thailand and became first Indian to win the title of ABF.

Shaik won India's first-ever medal in the sport during the Commonwealth Tenpin Bowling Championship 2002 in which he won gold medals in Singles and Masters and a silver medal in All Events.

In 2015, Shaik moved to Delhi High Court seeking direction to the government to nominate him for that year's Arjun Award.

References

Indian ten-pin bowling players
Bowlers at the 2002 Asian Games
Asian Games competitors for India